Arethas or Aretas ( al-Ḥārith bin-Ka'ab) was the leader of the Christian community of Najran in the early 6th century, was executed during the persecution of Christians by the Jewish king Dhu Nuwas in 523.

He is known from the Acta S. Arethae (also called Martyrium sancti Arethae or Martyrium Arethae)  which exists in two recensions: the earlier and more authentic, which was found by Michel Le Quien (Oriens Christianus, ii. 428) and was subsequently dated as no later than the 7th century; the later, revised by Simeon Metaphrastes, dates from the 10th century. The Ge'ez and Arabic versions of the text were published in 2006  and the Greek version in 2007.

See also 
 Arab Christians

References

523 deaths
6th-century Arabs
Ancient history of Yemen
History of Saudi Arabia
Year of birth unknown
Arab Christian saints
6th-century Christian saints
6th-century Christian martyrs